St Xavier's Senior Secondary School is a private Catholic secondary school located in Jaipur, in Rajasthan in north-western India. The school was established by the Jesuits in 1943. In the year 2016, St Xavier's School, Jaipur had celebrated its 75th Anniversary.

History

The school was established in 1943. Following a visit to St Xavier's School, Patna, Mirza Ismail, the prime minister of Jaipur State, wished to have a similar institution in his home city, Jaipur. As a result, the Jesuits took over management of St. Mary's Boys School, which had been founded two years earlier, in 1941. The school became co-educational in 1989.

Notable alumni 

 Lt. Amit Bhardwaj, a soldier martyred in the Kargil War
 Rajiv Mehrishi, Comptroller and Auditor General of India
 Pratap Bhanu Mehta, vice-chancellor of Ashok University
 Raghubir Singh, photographer
 Asrani, Indian Actor.

See also

 List of Jesuit schools
 List of schools in Rajasthan

References

External links
 Official website
 Student's portal
 St.Xavier's alumni website

Jesuit secondary schools in India
Jesuit primary schools in India
Boys' schools in India
High schools and secondary schools in Rajasthan
Christian schools in Rajasthan
Private schools in Rajasthan
Schools in Jaipur
Educational institutions established in 1941
1941 establishments in India